Schizax senex is a species of beetle in the family Cerambycidae, the only species in the genus Schizax.

References

Trachyderini